The Middle Country Central School District (MCCSD) covers approximately  in the Town of Brookhaven, Suffolk County, New York, United States.

It is composed of the villages and hamlets of Centereach, Selden, parts of Lake Grove, Coram, Lake Ronkonkoma, Port Jefferson Station and Farmingville.

The district is currently composed of eight elementary schools, two Pre-kindergarten/Kindergarten Centers, two middle schools, and two high schools.  The K-12 student enrollment projection for the 2009/10 school year was approximately 11,000 plus over 500 pre-kindergarten students.

History
Middle Country Central School District was formed in 1957 through the consolidation of the Centereach and Selden school districts (also known as School Districts 11 and 12 at the time, respectively).  At the time, it consisted of five kindergarten rooms and 51 elementary classrooms.

At the time of consolidation, the area was going through unprecedented growth due to suburban spread.   In 1954, for example, the Centereach School District faced a classroom-shortage crisis.  It was solved only when local home developers (whose buyers and new area residents were causing the crisis) volunteered to build ten "one room schoolhouses" in one month's time, with a plan to later convert the buildings into residences.  This "Unity Drive" project name was adopted by the elementary school (now a Pre-K/Kindergarten center) built nearby a few years later.

Suburban growth resulted in Middle Country becoming the fastest growing school district in the state.

The student population peaked in 1976 at 16,738.

Schools

High schools
 Centereach High School
 Newfield High School

Middle schools
 Dawnwood Middle School is located at 10 43rd Street in Centereach.  It educates around 1,200 students in grades 6-8 under principal Daniel Katchihtes.  They were formerly known as the "Dragons" but, they are now known as the "Cougars".  The "Cougars" are also the mascot of Centereach High School. The name "Dawnwood" derives from two of the early suburban developments in Centereach, Dawn Estates and Eastwood Village.  Most students of Dawnwood go to Centereach High School after eighth grade. 
 Selden Middle School is located at 22 Jefferson Avenue in Centereach.  It educates students in grades 6-8 under principal Andrew Bennet and assistant principals Ms. Baldwin and Ms. Oshrin. Formerly known as the "Seahawks", they are now known as the "Wolverines".  Most students of Selden Middle School go to Newfield High School after eighth grade.

In both schools, in sixth grade, each student is assigned to a 'team' of, typically, three or more teachers, each teaching an essential academic class.  The students typically rotate teachers throughout the day.  Other classes are taught by teachers not assigned to a team.  During the 2010/2011 school year, the schools decided to rename their mascots to reflect their high school affiliates.

Elementary schools
 Eugene Auer Memorial Elementary School
 Hawkins Path Elementary School
 Holbrook Road Elementary School
 Jericho Elementary School
 New Lane Elementary School
 North Coleman Road Elementary School
 Oxhead Road Elementary School
 Stagecoach Elementary School

Pre-K/Kindergarten Centers
 Bicycle Path Pre-K/Kindergarten Center
 Unity Drive Pre-K/Kindergarten Center

Board of Education
Current Board Members (As of July 01, 2022 are::

All of the members serve three year terms and all terms start at the first board meeting in July and expire on June 30.

 Kathleen Walsh 
 Doreen Feldmann 
 Deborah Mann-Rodriguez 
 Arlene Barresi 
 John Debenedetto 
 Denise Haggerty 
 Robert Feeney
 Robert Hallock
 Dawn Sharrock 

Three of the nine members are up for election every year and the school board election takes place on the 3rd Tuesday in May.

References

External links
 Official site

Education in Suffolk County, New York
School districts in New York (state)
1957 establishments in New York (state)
School districts established in 1957